Morwen may refer to:

People with the given name
Morwen Thistlethwaite, knot theorist and professor of mathematics

Characters
Morwen Eledhwen, the wife of Húrin and the mother of his children in J. R. R. Tolkien's Middle-earth legendarium
Morwen Steelsheen, the mother of King Théoden of Rohan in J. R. R. Tolkien's The Lord of the Rings
an original character in The Lord of the Rings film trilogy
a playable character in the 2004 video game The Lord of the Rings: The Third Age
a character in the Enchanted Forest Chronicles novel series by Patricia C. Wrede